Automedon (fl. early 1st century AD) was an ancient Greek satirical poet from Cyzicus, whose poems are preserved in the Greek Anthology. 

Automedon's works were added to the Anthology by Philippus of Thessalonica, around the reign of Caligula. One of his poems satirises an orator called Nicetes who probably lived in the time of Augustus and Tiberius. It is thus likely that Automedon lived in the early first century AD. 

One poem in the Anthology, attributed to Automedon, is ascribed in the Palatine Anthology to the third-century BC poet Theocritus and may be from that period.

References

Knox, Bernard, ed. The Norton Book of Classical Literature. New York: WW Norton Co., 1993, p. 585

Ancient Greek poets